Heavy Heavy Low Low is an American mathcore band from San Jose, California.

Biography
Formed in early 2004 in San Jose, California, they played shows throughout the West Coast and developed a significant following, becoming known in the early 2000s screamo scene for their energetic stage presence.

They released their first EP Kids Kids Kids in 2004. The EP was recorded in a practice space in San Jose by Andy Kugler.

Their first full-length release entitled Courtside Seats to the Greatest Fuck of All Time, was released by Twelve Gauge Records in 2005 and featured their single, "Inhalant Abuse Is Illegal And Can Be Fatal". 

Following their first full length, they self released the ...Fuck It!? EP in 2005 and began touring beyond the west coast. This EP was recorded by Sam Pura in Pura's garage. It included their single, "Tell Shannon Her Crafts Are Ready". It also includes current singer Robert Smith as well as previous singer Matthew Caudle. 

They signed with New Weathermen Records, a division of Ferret Music, in mid-2006 and began work on their second full length. In September 2006, Everything's Watched, Everyone's Watching was released, which featured a few old songs re-done and remastered, along with numerous brand new tracks. This album was recorded by Casey Bates and engineered by Tom Pfaeffle outside of Seattle. Extensive and constant touring in support of the record ensued.

In early 2007, their out of print EP ...Fuck It?! was re-released via Ferret Music and was limited to 1,000 copies. The release also features an exclusive B-side track titled "Short Term Exposure, Long Term Damage".

They released their third full-length album Turtle Nipple & The Toxic Shock August 19, 2008. The album was recorded and produced by Sam Pura in Oakland, California. Choosing to record with at the time lesser known Pura allowed the band to stretch out allotted label money and spend 2 months recording the album. The album was a significant shift from their past work and took on a more psychedelic and experimental sound. 

In early 2009, the band left Ferret/New Weatherman Records and announced that they would re-sign with Twelve Gauge Records. They finally released Hospital Bomber EP in August 2010.

Their final EP, Hospital Bomber, has been compared to their last album regarding the coarser vocals of Robert Smith and a decidedly different musical style. The instruments for Hospital Bomber were all recorded at once, playing the songs all the way through several times until a single take was chosen for each song. This technique gave the album a rawer sound than their previous albums. In a 2010 interview discussing Hospital Bomber, Robert Smith said the track "We Incompetent Sperm" was his favorite off the EP. " I was sick at the time so my voice sounds different than the other songs and it's a song about an old, dirty woman who worries about everything." Praise was held for their experimenting with this newer sound, incorporating aspects of jazz, punk, metal, and dissonance while prizing technical work and complete originality. Their EP is available to buy online through direct download.  

The band called it quits in 2009.  On February 3, 2013, the band made a post regarding the breakup on their Facebook page.  "HHLL is not a band. We broke up at the end of 2009 and never planned on letting anyone know because it's pathetic when bands take themselves so seriously and drag out their exit statement from the 'scene'. Australia was our last (and our most fun) tour ever. So thanks for liking us but this band is played the fuck out and we'll be doing newer, better things in our musical future."

Following the break up, members went on to start additional bands Downstaaiirs, I wanna Die, Donkeylips, and Riled. These outfits mostly played house shows and smaller venues. Dan started the rap group Dem Dam Thang Boys and dedicated his life to kendama. He lives in a Prius and promotes the idea of Prius living.

In 2019, Heavy Heavy Low Low began posting on Instagram new artwork for the album for a vinyl reissue of Courtside Seats to the Greatest Fuck of All Time released by Twelve Gauge Records.

In July 2019, they announced they were reuniting to play a handful of shows in 2020 with the original lineup along the west coast. The tour was postponed due to the COVID-19 pandemic. They indicated that they still plan to play shows when possible. 

In 2020 they uploaded a previously unreleased live in-studio EP "Steak, Tits, Football (I Hate Myself)". The EP was released on cassette by Illuminate My Heart Records and Larry Records, as well as vinyl release by Silent Pendulum Records.

In 2021 Robbie Smith, Christopher and Andrew Fritter, along with Sam Pura formed Bone Cutter and released a self titled EP through Twelve Gauge Records.

Touring
The band has toured throughout the US, as well as a tour in both  Europe and Australia. 

The band has toured extensively with Fear Before and the Fall of Troy. Other tourmates include: the Number Twelve Looks Like You, the Jonbenet, Ed Gein, Nights Like These, Ligeia, Murder by Death, Thursday, Horse the band, So Many Dynamos, the End, Haste the Day and Poison the Well. They also took part in the 2007 Sounds of the Underground Tour alongside the likes of GWAR, Shadows Fall, Goatwhore and Every Time I Die. They toured with Foxy Shazam and Tera Melos in Fall of 2007. Their last US tour was the 2008 Stay Weird tour with Fear Before and Dr. Manhattan. 

They announced a tour of Australia at the start of December 2010 with Australian band Totally Unicorn. They also played a few shows throughout California around this time. The Australian tour was their final tour and featured a four-piece line-up with Sam Pura filling-in for Danny Rankin on guitar. In 2012, band member Rob Smith was featured in an episode of Channel Seven's Border Security: Australia's Front Line in which he attempted to enter Australia without the appropriate visa. The episode indicated that Rob was sent back to the US without being able to complete the planned tour, however he in fact stayed in Australia and played the planned shows.

The band were set for a series of reunion shows throughout California in the summer of 2020, which were ultimately cancelled due to the Covid-19 pandemic. 

In 2022, the band resumed their reunion show plans and performed a handful of dates on the eastern and western coast of the US, along with a string of shows throughout Texas in December with Duck Duck Goose and Executioner's Mask. These reunion shows featured the band's most well-known line-up of Robbie, Chris, Andrew, Dan, and Ryan.

Members

Final
Robbie Smith – vocals (2004–2010)
Danny Rankin – guitar, vocals (2004–2010)
Andrew Fritter – bass (2004–2010)
Christopher Fritter – drums (2004–2010)
Sam Pura - guitar (2009-2010)

Past
 Riley McTeague – vocals (2004)
 Matthew Caudle – vocals (2004–2006) 
 Robbie Dalla – guitar (2004–2005)
 Ryan "Chip" Madden – guitar (2005–2009)

Discography

Full lengths
Courtside Seats... (2005)
Everything's Watched, Everyone's Watching (2006)
Turtle Nipple and the Toxic Shock (2008)

EPs
Kids Kids Kids (2004)
Fuck It?! (2005)
Hospital Bomber (2010)
Steak, Tits, Football (I Hate Myself) (recorded 2006, released 2019)

References

External links

Heavy Heavy Low Low on Facebook

Heavy metal musical groups from California
American mathcore musical groups
Musical groups disestablished in 2012
Musical quintets
Ferret Music artists
Metalcore musical groups from California